Allan Haines Murray (November 10, 1906 — January 7, 1982) was a Canadian professional ice hockey player who played 277 games in the National Hockey League with the New York Americans between 1933 and 1940. He was born in Stratford, Ontario.

Career statistics

Regular season and playoffs

External links 
 

1906 births
1982 deaths
Buffalo Bisons (IHL) players
Canadian ice hockey defencemen
Ice hockey people from Ontario
Los Angeles Kings scouts
New York Americans players
Sportspeople from Stratford, Ontario
Syracuse Stars (IHL) players